Adolph is an unincorporated community in Randolph County, West Virginia, United States. Originally known as West Huttonsville, Adolph was named by the Board on Geographic Names in 1977.

The first settlement at Adolph was made in the early 1880s.

References

Unincorporated communities in Randolph County, West Virginia
Unincorporated communities in West Virginia